The Graurheindorfer Burg (also Burg Graurheindorf or Rheindorfer Burg) is a Schloss located in the  district of Bonn

History 
On the site of today's mansion there was already a manor house since 1131, which was expanded into a castle around 1478. The present manor house was built in 1755 according to plans by Michael Leveilly of Maria Debèche.

Architecture 
The three-story house with an almost square ground plan is located in the middle of a park at the end of an avenue and was built in the style of a small Lustschloss. The façade of the house is structured by Haustein-framed segmental arches. On top of the steep gambrel sits a push-up spire with an octagonal turret. The entrance is reached by a central double-flight staircase.

Current usage 
The building is privately owned and used as a dwelling. The castle, the park and a stone path cross stand as a  under Cultural heritage management.

References

External links 

Castles
Bonn
Buildings and structures completed in 1758